Mimolagrida ruficollis is a species of beetle in the family Cerambycidae. It was described by Stephan von Breuning in 1957. It is known from Madagascar. It contains the varietas Mimolagrida ruficollis var. nigrescens.

References

Tragocephalini
Beetles described in 1957